Macaco Tião ("Tião the Monkey") (January 16, 1963 in Rio de Janeiro – December 23, 1996 in Rio de Janeiro) was a chimpanzee of the Rio de Janeiro Zoological Garden who was very popular with children and visitors.

His name ("Tião", a nickname for "Sebastião") is in memory of Rio de Janeiro's patron saint, Saint Sebastian (São Sebastião).

History
Tião started to become popular in the 1980s for his temperament, regarded as constant "bad mood" and having the habit of throwing mud and feces on the visitors of the zoo, especially politicians such as Marcello Alencar.

Tião became a celebrity in Brazil, when in 1988, the comedians who ran newspapers Casseta Popular and Planeta Diário (who would later join forces as Casseta & Planeta), jokingly created his extra official candidature for mayor as a protest in defence of null voting. At the time, voting was written on papers instead of registered using voting machines. It is estimated that more than 400,000 ballots were cast for him, and he reached third place in an election with 12 candidates. Because of that, he is now on the Guinness World Records as the most voted chimpanzee in the world. As Tião was not a registered candidate, all his ballots were considered as null. In 1996, the voting system in Brazil was changed to electronic machines, so votes could no longer be cast for non-registered candidates.

Macaco Tião had always attracted enormous attention and had a special place in the zoo, built especially for him.

Nationally famous, various Brazilian newspapers and the French Le Monde reported the news of his death, in December, 23 of 1996. Tião died of diabetes at the age of 33. The city of Rio de Janeiro declared official mourning of three days, with the flags of Rio de Janeiro's Zoo being flown at half-staff. His body was taken to the primate center of the state of Rio de Janeiro (Centro de Primatologia do Estado do Rio de Janeiro - CPRJ), in the Guapimirim city, where his skeleton is preserved.

See also
 List of individual apes

References

Animals in politics
1988 in Brazil
Individual chimpanzees